Ro-112 was an Imperial Japanese Navy Ro-100-class submarine. Completed and commissioned in September 1943, she served in World War II, operating off Australia, in the Netherlands East Indies, and off the Admiralty Islands and the Philippine Islands. She was sunk in February 1945 during her eighth war patrol.

Design and description
The Ro-100 class was a medium-sized, coastal submarine derived from the preceding Kaichū type. They displaced  surfaced and  submerged.

For surface running, the boats were powered by two  diesel engines, each driving one propeller shaft. When submerged each propeller was driven by a  electric motor. They could reach  on the surface and  underwater.

The boats were armed with four internal bow  torpedo tubes and carried a total of eight torpedoes. They were also armed with two single mounts for  Type 96 anti-aircraft guns or a single  L/40 AA gun.

Construction and commissioning

Ro-112 was laid down as Submarine No. 403 on 20 June 1942 by Kawasaki at Senshu, Japan. Renamed Ro-112 on 5 February 1943, she was launched on 25 March 1943. She then was towed to Kawasaki's shipyard at Kobe, Japan, for fitting-out. She was completed and commissioned at Kobe on 14 September 1943.

Service history

September 1943–January 1944
Upon commissioning, Ro-112 was attached to the Kure Naval District and was assigned to Submarine Squadron 11 for workups. On 25 December 1943, she was reassigned to Submarine Division 30 in the 8th Fleet in the Southeast Area Fleet. She departed Kure, Japan, on 26 December 1943 bound for Surabaya on Java in the Japanese-occupied Netherlands East Indies. Submarine Division 30 was reassigned to Submarine Squadron 8 in the 6th Fleet on 1 January 1944.

First war patrol

Ro-112 got underway from Surabaya on 19 January 1944 for her first war patrol, assigned a patrol area off Australia. The patrol was uneventful, and she returned to Surabaya in mid-February 1944.

Second war patrol

Ro-112 put to sea from Surabaya to begin her second war patrol in early March 1944. Rasher′s watch officer described Ro-112 as a black submarine of the "Ro-51 class." At 11:49, Rasher fired four Mark 14 Mod 3 torpedoes at Ro-112, but Ro-112 turned to port and evaded them.

While at sea, Ro-112 was reassigned to Submarine Division 51 in Submarine Squadron 7 in the 6th Fleet on 20 March 1944. She concluded her patrol by calling at Surabaya from 25 March to 11 April 1944, then set course for Saipan in the Mariana Islands, which she reached on 20 April 1944.

Third war patrol

Ro-112 got underway from Saipan on 24 April 1944 for her third war patrol, assigned a patrol area north of New Guinea. While at sea, she was reassigned to Patrol Unit B on 29 April 1944 and ordered to operate south of Woleai′s Mereyon Island. Otherwise, her patrol passed quietly, and she returned to Saipan on 6 May 1944.

Fourth war patrol

The picket line was tasked with providing warning of any move toward the Palau Islands by Allied invasion forces.

On 18 May 1944, U.S. Navy signals intelligence personnel intercepted and decrypted Japanese signals indicating the formation of Scouting Line NA between Truk and the Admiralties. The hunter-killer group had great success, sinking several of the submarines. She subsequently departed her patrol area and set course for Truk, which she reached on 8 June 1944.

Fifth war patrol

Ro-112 departed Truk on 14 June 1944 to conduct her fifth war patrol, ordered to patrol in the Philippine Sea. Her patrol was quiet, and she returned to Truk on 27 June 1944.

July–October 1944

Ro-112 got underway from Truk on 7 July 1944 bound for Yokosuka, Japan, which she reached on 17 July 1944. She later moved to Kure. On 15 August 1944, Submarine Division 51 was disbanded, and Ro-109 and Ro-112 were reassigned to the Kure Submarine Squadron for service as training vessels. On 25 September 1944, Ro-112 was reassigned to Submarine Division 33 in the Kure Submarine Squadron.

On 13 October 1944, the Combined Fleet ordered the activation of Operation Shō-Gō 1, the defense of the Philippine Islands, in anticipation of an American invasion of the islands. On 20 October 1944, the Battle of Leyte began with U.S. landings on Leyte in the Philippines, and that day  was reassigned to Submarine Division 34, subordinated directly to Combined Fleet headquarters.

Sixth and seventh war patrols
Ro-112 departed Kure to commence her sixth war patrol on 23 October 1944, heading for a patrol area in the Philippine Sea east of the Philippine Islands. The patrol was uneventful, and it concluded with her arrival at Mako in the Pescadores Islands on 21 November 1944. She got underway from Mako on 30 November 1944 for her seventh war patrol, assigned a patrol area in the Lamon Bay area off Luzon in the Philippines. After another quiet patrol, she returned to Kure on 28 December 1944.

Eighth war patrol

Ro-112 began her eighth war patrol on 22 January 1945, departing Kure bound for a patrol area in the South China Sea west of Luzon. After calling at Takao from 7 to 9 February 1945, Ro-112 got back underway and set course for Batulinao.

Loss

Batfish′s radar detector also picked up Ro-112′s radar emissions. Batfish lost contact at 20:43 when Ro-112 submerged.

At 21:05, Batfish′s sound operator heard Ro-112 blow her ballast tanks, and Ro-112 surfaced at 21:06.

On 20 February 1945, the Imperial Japanese Navy declared Ro-112 to be presumed lost in the Luzon Strait with all 61 men on board. The Japanese struck her from the Navy list on 10 May 1945.

Notes

References
 

1943 ships
Ships built by Kawasaki Heavy Industries
World War II submarines of Japan
Japanese submarines lost during World War II
Ro-100-class submarines
Maritime incidents in February 1945
World War II shipwrecks in the Pacific Ocean
Submarines sunk by submarines
Ships sunk by American submarines
Ships lost with all hands